Somebody Ate My Planet is an album released on August 12, 1992 by the New Zealand band Able Tasmans.

Track listing
"Circular"
"Fault in the Frog"
"School Is No Good for You"
"Asian Aphrodisiac Solution"
"The Cliff"
"Weight of Love"
"Sweet State"
"Napoleons Last Letter to France"
"A Conversation with Mark Byram"
"Big Fat"
"Not Fair"

1992 albums
Able Tasmans albums
Flying Nun Records albums